M. Susan Savage (born March 30, 1952) is an American Democratic politician from Oklahoma.  She was the 36th Mayor of Tulsa from 1992 to 2002, the first woman to hold that office.  From 2003 to 2011, she was the 29th Secretary of State of Oklahoma.

Biography
Savage graduated from Edison High School in Tulsa and in 1974 earned a B.A. degree from Beaver College (now Arcadia University) in Pennsylvania. She returned to Tulsa in 1977 and became executive director of the Metropolitan Tulsa Citizens Crime Commission. Savage went on to become chief of staff to then-Tulsa Mayor Rodger Randle before eventually becoming elected mayor herself in a 1992 special election to complete the remainder of Randle's term.

Mayor of Tulsa
Savage served as mayor of Tulsa from 1992 to 2002, and was the first woman to hold that office.

As mayor, Savage was responsible for a $500 million budget and 4,000 employees. Her administration was marked by unprecedented job growth, neighborhood revitalization, public safety improvements and improved government efficiency. Savage focused on improving streets, parks, water, wastewater, stormwater, public safety, cultural and correctional facilities in Tulsa.

During Savage's administration, the Reason Public Policy Institute of Los Angeles ranked Tulsa 3rd among 44 U.S. cities for how well it delivered government services. Newsweek magazine featured Savage as one of the nation's 25 "mayors to watch" in 1996.

Secretary of State
Savage was appointed by Governor of Oklahoma Brad Henry as Secretary of State of Oklahoma and served from 2003 to 2011.

In July 2013 Savage became a consultant and senior director of philanthropic development for Morton Comprehensive Health Services, a nonprofit health services provider in northeastern Oklahoma. In 2016, Savage became CEO of Morton.

She currently lives in Tulsa and has two daughters.

Awards and recognition
 Oklahoma Municipal League Hall of Fame for City and Town Officials in 2005
 2002 National Conference for Community and Justice Honoree for leadership
 Honorary Doctor of Laws from Arcadia University
 Past recipient of the Oklahoma Human Rights Award
 2009 induction to the Oklahoma Women's Hall of Fame

Appointments
 National Advisory Board of the Riley Institute for Urban Affairs at the College of Charleston
 Executive Board member, Southern Regional Education Board
 Advisory Board member, Oklahoma Academy for State Goals
 Advisory Board member, Oklahoma City United Way
 Trustee, Oklahoma Nature Conservancy Board of Directors
 Trustee, Oklahoma Foundation for Excellence
 Board member, Creative Oklahoma, Inc.

References

External links

1952 births
Arcadia University alumni
Living people
Mayors of Tulsa, Oklahoma
Oklahoma Democrats
Secretaries of State of Oklahoma
Tulsa Public Schools alumni
Women in Oklahoma politics
Women mayors of places in Oklahoma
21st-century American women